Vedh Bhavishyacha is an Indian Marathi language astrological television show which is running on Zee Marathi. Pandit Atulshastri Bhagare Guruji hosts this show. The show premiered its second season from 8 June 2020 airing daily. It is one of the longest running show on Marathi television.

Plot 
An astrology expert predicts the future of the 12 zodiac signs on the basis of the positions of the planets and the stars. He also narrates and interprets the stories from ancient Hindu texts.

Special episode 
 22 August 2020
 10 September 2021

References

External links 
 Vedh Bhavishyacha at ZEE5
 
Marathi-language television shows
2020 Indian television series debuts
Zee Marathi original programming